Izvori (Serbian and Montenegrin for "Springs") may refer to: 
 , a village in the Zvečan Municipality
 , a village in the Cetinje Municipality

See also 
 Izvor (disambiguation)